Einhard (also Eginhard or Einhart; ;  775 – 14 March 840) was a Frankish scholar and courtier. Einhard was a dedicated servant of Charlemagne and his son Louis the Pious; his main work is a biography of Charlemagne, the Vita Karoli Magni, "one of the most precious literary bequests of the early Middle Ages".

Public life
Einhard was from the eastern German-speaking part of the Frankish Kingdom. Born into a family of landowners of some importance, his parents sent him to be educated by the monks of Fulda, one of the most impressive centers of learning in the Frank lands. Perhaps due to his small stature, which restricted his riding and sword-fighting ability, Einhard concentrated his energies on scholarship, especially the mastering of Latin. He was accepted into the hugely wealthy court of Charlemagne around 791 or 792. Charlemagne actively sought to amass scholarly men around him and established a royal school led by the Northumbrian scholar Alcuin. Einhard was evidently a talented builder and construction manager, because Charlemagne put him in charge of the completion of several palace complexes including Aachen and Ingelheim. Despite the fact that Einhard was on intimate terms with Charlemagne, he never achieved office in his reign. In 814, on Charlemagne's death, his son Louis the Pious made Einhard his private secretary. Einhard retired from court during the time of the disputes between Louis and his sons in the spring of 830.

He died at Seligenstadt in 840.

Private life
Einhard was married to Emma, of whom little is known. There is a possibility that their marriage bore a son, Vussin. Their marriage also appears to have been exceptionally liberal for the period, with Emma being as active as Einhard, if not more so, in the handling of their property. It is said that in the later years of their marriage Emma and Einhard abstained from sexual relations, choosing instead to focus their attentions on their many religious commitments. Though he was undoubtedly devoted to her, Einhard wrote nothing of his wife until after her death on 13 December 835, when he wrote to a friend that he was reminded of her loss in ‘every day, in every action, in every undertaking, in all the administration of the house and household, in everything needing to be decided upon and sorted out in my religious and earthly responsibilities’.

Religious beliefs
Einhard made numerous references to himself as a "sinner" according to his strong Christian faith. He erected churches at both of his estates in Michelstadt and Mulinheim. In Michelstadt, he also saw fit to build a basilica completed in 827 and then sent a servant, Ratleic, to Rome with an end to find relics for the new building. Once in Rome, Ratleic robbed a catacomb of the bones of the Martyrs Marcellinus and Peter and had them translated to Michelstadt. Once there, the relics made it known they were unhappy with their new tomb and thus had to be moved again to Mulinheim. Once established there, they proved to be miracle workers. Although unsure as to why these saints should choose such a "sinner" as their patron, Einhard nonetheless set about ensuring they continued to receive a resting place fitting of their honour.  Between 831 and 834 he founded a Benedictine Monastery and, after the death of his wife, served as its Abbot until his own death in 840.

Local lore
Local lore from Seligenstadt portrays Einhard as the lover of Emma, one of Charlemagne's daughters, and has the couple elope from court. Charlemagne found them at Seligenstadt (then called Obermühlheim) and forgave them. This account is used to explain the name "Seligenstadt" by folk etymology. Einhard and his wife were originally buried in one sarcophagus in the choir of the church in Seligenstadt, but in 1810 the sarcophagus was presented by the Grand Duke of Hesse to the count of Erbach, who claims descent from Einhard as the husband of Imma, the reputed daughter of Charlemagne. The count put it in the famous chapel of his castle at Erbach in the Odenwald.

Works
The most famous of Einhard's works is his biography of Charlemagne, the Vita Karoli Magni, "The Life of Charlemagne" (c. 817–836), which provides much direct information about Charlemagne's life and character, written sometime between 817 and 830. In composing this he relied heavily upon the Royal Frankish Annals. Einhard's literary model was the classical work of the Roman historian Suetonius, the Lives of the Caesars, though it is important to stress that the work is very much Einhard's own, that is to say he adapts the models and sources for his own purposes. His work was written as a praise of Charlemagne, whom he regarded as a foster-father (nutritor) and to whom he was a debtor "in life and death". The work thus contains an understandable degree of bias, Einhard taking care to exculpate Charlemagne in some matters, not mention others, and to gloss over certain issues which would be of embarrassment to Charlemagne, such as the morality of his daughters; by contrast, other issues are curiously not glossed over, like his concubines. 

Einhard is also responsible for three other extant works: a collection of letters, On the Translations and the Miracles of SS. Marcellinus and Petrus, and On the Adoration of the Cross. The latter dates from ca. 830 and was not rediscovered until 1885, when Ernst Dümmler identified a text in a manuscript in Vienna as the missing Libellus de adoranda cruce, which Einhard had dedicated to his pupil Lupus Servatus.

The Arch of Einhard was a reliquary made by Einhard, which reproduced on a small scale a Roman triumphal arch that represented the victory of Christianity.  It has not survived.

See also
 Royal Frankish Annals

References

Bibliography
 
 
 
 
 
 
 
 
 
 Tischler, Matthias M. (2001) Einharts Vita Karoli. Studien zur Entstehung, Überlieferung und Rezeption (MGH. Schriften 48, I–II), Hanover: Hahn. .

External links

 
Holland, Arthur William (1911). "Einhard". In Chisholm, Hugh (ed.). Encyclopædia Britannica. 9. (11th ed.). Cambridge University Press. pp. 134–135.
 Schlager, Patricius (1909). "Einhard". In Catholic Encyclopedia. 5. New York: Robert Appleton Company. pp. 82–83.
 
 
 Vita Karoli Magni—Einhard's Life of Charlemagne, Latin text at The Latin Library
 , translated by 
 Einhard-Preis Literature prize awarded by the Einhard-Foundation of Seligenstadt to authors for writing an outstanding biography
 Opera Omnia by Migne Patrologia Latina with analytical indexes
 
 
 Einhardi vita Karoli Magni  in Bibliotheca Augustana
 The Einhard Way from Michelstadt to Seligenstadt
 Home page of the Einhard Foundation at Seligenstadt
 Home page of the Einhard Society, Seligenstadt

770s births
840 deaths
9th-century Latin writers
Frankish historians
Charlemagne
Historians from the Carolingian Empire
9th-century astronomers